"Gravity" is a song written by Dan Hartman and Charlie Midnight and recorded by James Brown.  It appears on Brown's 1986 album of the same name. It was also released as a single and charted #26 R&B and #93 Pop.

Personnel
James Brown: Vocals
Dan Hartman: Guitars, Keyboards, Programming
T. M. Stevens: Bass, Background vocals
Ray Marchica: Drums
The Uptown Horns (Arno Hecht, Bob Funk, Crispin Cioe, "Hollywood" Paul Litteral): All Brass Instruments
Chris Lord-Alge - mixing

References

James Brown songs
Songs written by Dan Hartman
Songs written by Charlie Midnight
1986 singles
Scotti Brothers Records singles
1986 songs